This is an incomplete list of Statutory Rules of Northern Ireland in 2012.

1-100 

 The Occupational Pension Schemes (Employer Debt and Miscellaneous Amendments) Regulations (Northern Ireland) 2012 (S.R. 2012 No. 1)
 The Official Statistics Order (Northern Ireland) 2012 (S.R. 2012 No. 2)
 The Specified Products from China (Restriction on First Placing on the Market) (Amendment) Regulations (Northern Ireland) 2012 (S.R. 2012 No. 3)
 The Parking and Waiting Restrictions (Ballymoney) (Amendment) Order (Northern Ireland) 2012 (S.R. 2012 No. 4)
 The Parking and Waiting Restrictions (Belfast) (Amendment) Order (Northern Ireland) 2012 (S.R. 2012 No. 5)
 The Parking Places (Disabled Persons' Vehicles) (Amendment) Order (Northern Ireland) 2012 (S.R. 2012 No. 6)
 The Motor Vehicles (Taxi Drivers’ Licences) (Amendment) Regulations (Northern Ireland) 2012 (S.R. 2012 No. 7)
 The Local Government (Specified Bodies) Regulations (Northern Ireland) 2012 (S.R. 2012 No. 8)
 Licensing and Registration of Clubs (Amendment) (2011 Act) (Commencement No.1) Order (Northern Ireland) 2012 (S.R. 2012 No. 9 (C. 1))
 The Local Government (Constituting Joint Committees as Bodies Corporate) Order (Northern Ireland) 2012 (S.R. 2012 No. 10)
 The Petroleum (Consolidation) Act (Amendment of Licensing Provisions) Regulations (Northern Ireland) 2012 (S.R. 2012 No. 11)
 Plant Protection Products (Amendment) Regulations (Northern Ireland) 2012 (S.R. 2012 No. 12)
 The Clean Neighbourhoods and Environment (2011 Act) (Commencement, Savings and Transitional Provisions) Order (Northern Ireland) 2012 (S.R. 2012 No. 13 (C. 2))
 The Jobseeker's Allowance (Work Experience) (Amendment) Regulations (Northern Ireland) 2012 (S.R. 2012 No. 14)
 The Protection from Tobacco (Sales from Vending Machines) Regulations (Northern Ireland) 2012 (S.R. 2012 No. 15)
 The Road Traffic (2007 Order) (Commencement No. 9) Order (Northern Ireland) 2012 (S.R. 2012 No. 16 (C. 3))
 The Road Traffic (Financial Penalty Deposit) Order (Northern Ireland) 2012 (S.R. 2012 No. 17)
 The Road Traffic (Financial Penalty Deposit) (Appropriate Amount) Order (Northern Ireland) 2012 (S.R. 2012 No. 18)
 The Road Traffic (Immobilisation, Removal and Disposal of Vehicles) Regulations (Northern Ireland) 2012 (S.R. 2012 No. 19)
 The High Hedges (2011 Act) (Commencement) Order (Northern Ireland) 2012 (S.R. 2012 No. 20 (C. 4))
 The Wildlife and Natural Environment (2011 Act) (Commencement No.3) Order (Northern Ireland) 2012 (S.R. 2012 No. 21 (C. 5))
 The Licensing (Form of Licence) (Amendment) Regulations (Northern Ireland) 2012 (S.R. 2012 No. 22)
 The Licensing (Register of Licences) (Amendment) Regulations (Northern Ireland) 2012 (S.R. 2012 No. 23)
 The Licensing (Notice relating to Age) Regulations (Northern Ireland) 2012 (S.R. 2012 No. 24)
 The Spring Traps Approval Order (Northern Ireland) 2012 (S.R. 2012 No. 25)
 The Registration of Clubs (Certificate of Registration) (Amendment) Regulations (Northern Ireland) 2012 (S.R. 2012 No. 26)
 The Registration of Clubs (Notice relating to Age) Regulations (Northern Ireland) 2012 (S.R. 2012 No. 27)
 Licensing and Registration of Clubs (Amendment) (2011 Act) (Commencement No.2) Order (Northern Ireland) 2012 (S.R. 2012 No. 28 (C. 6))
 The Parking and Waiting Restrictions (Omagh) (No. 2) Order (Amendment) Order (Northern Ireland) 2012 (S.R. 2012 No. 29)
 The Ballydogherty Road (U5003), Loughgilly (Abandonment) Order (Northern Ireland) 2012 (S.R. 2012 No. 30)
 The North Circular Road and Tarry Lane, Lurgan (Abandonment) Order (Northern Ireland) 2012 (S.R. 2012 No. 31)
 The Control of Traffic (Belfast) Order (Northern Ireland) 2012 (S.R. 2012 No. 32)
 The High Hedges (Fee) Regulations (Northern Ireland) 2012 (S.R. 2012 No. 33)
 The Controls on Dogs (Non-application to Designated Land) Order (Northern Ireland) 2012 (S.R. 2012 No. 34)
 The Environmental Offences (Fixed Penalties) (Miscellaneous Provisions) Regulations (Northern Ireland) 2012 (S.R. 2012 No. 35)
 The Statutory Nuisances (Insects) Regulations (Northern Ireland) 2012 (S.R. 2012 No. 36)
 The Statutory Nuisances (Artificial Lighting) (Designation of Relevant Sports) Order (Northern Ireland) 2012 (S.R. 2012 No. 37)
 Street Litter Control Notices (Amendment) Order (Northern Ireland) 2012 (S.R. 2012 No. 38)
 The Dog Control Orders (Procedures) Regulations (Northern Ireland) 2012 (S.R. 2012 No. 39)
 The Social Security Pensions (Flat Rate Introduction Year) Order (Northern Ireland) 2012 (S.R. 2012 No. 40)
 The Sunbeds (2011 Act) (Commencement No. 1) Order (Northern Ireland) 2012 (S.R. 2012 No. 41 (C. 7))
 The Health and Personal Social Services (Superannuation Scheme, Injury Benefits and Additional Voluntary Contributions), Health and Social Care (Pension Scheme) (Amendment) Regulations (Northern Ireland) 2012 (S.R. 2012 No. 42)
 The Old Church Road, Newtownabbey (Abandonment) Order (Northern Ireland) 2012 (S.R. 2012 No. 43)
 The Jobseeker's Allowance (Sanctions for Failure to Attend) Regulations (Northern Ireland) 2012 (S.R. 2012 No. 44)
 The Control of Traffic (Carrickfergus) Order (Northern Ireland) 2012 (S.R. 2012 No. 45)
 The Rates (Regional Rates) Order (Northern Ireland) 2012 (S.R. 2012 No. 46)
 The Rates (Microgeneration) Order (Northern Ireland) 2012 (S.R. 2012 No. 47)
 Licensing and Registration of Clubs (Amendment) (2011 Act) (Commencement No.3) Order (Northern Ireland) 2012 (S.R. 2012 No. 48 (C. 8))
 Superannuation (Chief Inspector of Criminal Justice in Northern Ireland) Order (Northern Ireland) 2012 (S.R. 2012 No. 49)
 Superannuation (Police Ombudsman for Northern Ireland) Order (Northern Ireland) 2012 (S.R. 2012 No. 50)
 Superannuation (Commissioner of the Northern Ireland Law Commission) Order (Northern Ireland) 2012 (S.R. 2012 No. 51)
 The Removal and Disposal of Vehicles (Prescribed Periods) Regulations (Northern Ireland) 2012 (S.R. 2012 No. 52)
 The Waiting Restrictions (Ormeau Road, Belfast) Order (Northern Ireland) 2012 (S.R. 2012 No. 53)
 The Cycle Routes (Amendment) Order (Northern Ireland) 2012 (S.R. 2012 No. 54)
 The Bus Lanes (East Bridge Street and Cromac Street, Belfast) Order (Northern Ireland) 2012 (S.R. 2012 No. 55)
 The Parking Places (Disabled Persons' Vehicles) (Amendment No. 2) Order (Northern Ireland) 2012 (S.R. 2012 No. 56)
 The University Terrace, Belfast (Abandonment) Order (Northern Ireland) 2012 (S.R. 2012 No. 57)
 The Shankbridge Road, Ballymena (Abandonment) Order (Northern Ireland) 2012 (S.R. 2012 No. 58)
 The Planning (Environmental Impact Assessment) Regulations (Northern Ireland) 2012 (S.R. 2012 No. 59)
 The Malone Beeches, Belfast (Abandonment) Order (Northern Ireland) 2012 (S.R. 2012 No. 60)
 The Statutory Nuisances (Appeals) Regulations (Northern Ireland) 2012 (S.R. 2012 No. 61)
 The Education (Student Support) (No. 2) Regulations (Northern Ireland) 2009 (Amendment) Regulations (Northern Ireland) 2012 (S.R. 2012 No. 62)
 The Prohibition of Traffic (Lenadoon, Belfast) Order (Northern Ireland) 2012 (S.R. 2012 No. 63)
 Police Service of Northern Ireland Pensions (Amendment) Regulations 2012 (S.R. 2012 No. 64)
 The Aujeszky's Disease Order (Northern Ireland) 2012 (S.R. 2012 No. 65)
 Aujeszky's Disease Scheme Order (Northern Ireland) 2012 (S.R. 2012 No. 66)
 The Pigs (Records, Identification and Movement) Order (Northern Ireland) 2012 (S.R. 2012 No. 67)
 The Health (2009 Act) (Commencement No. 1) Order (Northern Ireland) 2012 (S.R. 2012 No. 68 (C. 9))
 The Parking Places on Roads (Kilkeel) Order (Northern Ireland) 2012 (S.R. 2012 No. 69)
 The Westbourne Avenue, Ballymena (Abandonment) Order (Northern Ireland) 2012 (S.R. 2012 No. 70)
 The Firefighters’ Pension Scheme (Contributions) (Amendment) Order (Northern Ireland) 2012 (S.R. 2012 No. 71)
 The New Firefighters’ Pension Scheme (Contributions) (Amendment) Order (Northern Ireland) 2012 (S.R. 2012 No. 72)
 The Travelling Expenses and Remission of Charges (Amendment) Regulations (Northern Ireland) 2012 (S.R. 2012 No. 73)
 The Road Traffic (Financial Penalty Deposit) (Interest) Order (Northern Ireland) 2012 (S.R. 2012 No. 74)
 The Loading Bays on Roads (Amendment) Order (Northern Ireland) 2012 (S.R. 2012 No. 75)
 The Prohibition of Traffic (Lower Windsor, Belfast) Order (Northern Ireland) 2012 (S.R. 2012 No. 76)
 The Road Traffic Offenders (Prescribed Devices) Order (Northern Ireland) 2012 (S.R. 2012 No. 77)
 The Health and Personal Social Services (Superannuation), Health and Social Care (Pension Scheme) (Amendment) Regulations (Northern Ireland) 2012 (S.R. 2012 No. 78)
 The Rates (Social Sector Value) (Amendment) Regulations (Northern Ireland) 2012 (S.R. 2012 No. 79)
 The Parking Places and Loading Bays on Roads (Londonderry) (Amendment) Order (Northern Ireland) 2012 (S.R. 2012 No. 80)
 The Employment Rights (Increase of Limits) Order (Northern Ireland) 2012 (S.R. 2012 No. 81)
 Police Service of Northern Ireland and Police Service of Northern Ireland Reserve (Injury Benefit) (Amendment) Regulations 2012 (S.R. 2012 No. 82)
 The Mesothelioma Lump Sum Payments (Conditions and Amounts) (Amendment) Regulations (Northern Ireland) 2012 (S.R. 2012 No. 83)
 The Pneumoconiosis, etc., (Workers’ Compensation) (Payment of Claims) (Amendment) Regulations (Northern Ireland) 2012 (S.R. 2012 No. 84)
 Local Government (Payments to Councillors) Regulations (Northern Ireland) 2012 (S.R. 2012 No. 85)
 The Police Act 1997 (Criminal Records) (Amendment) Regulations (Northern Ireland) 2012 (S.R. 2012 No. 86)
 The Social Security Revaluation of Earnings Factors Order (Northern Ireland) 2012 (S.R. 2012 No. 87)
 The Social Security Pensions (Low Earnings Threshold) Order (Northern Ireland) 2012 (S.R. 2012 No. 88)
 The Social Security Pensions (Flat Rate Accrual Amount) Order (Northern Ireland) 2012 (S.R. 2012 No. 89)
 The Sunbeds (2011 Act) (Commencement No. 2) Order (Northern Ireland) 2012 (S.R. 2012 No. 90 (C. 10))
 The Sunbeds (Information) Regulations (Northern Ireland) 2012 (S.R. 2012 No. 91)
 The Sunbeds (Fixed Penalty) (Amount) Regulations (Northern Ireland) 2012 (S.R. 2012 No. 92)
 The Sunbeds (Fixed Penalty) (General) Regulations (Northern Ireland) 2012 (S.R. 2012 No. 93)
 The Belfast International Airport (Control Over Land) Order (Northern Ireland) 2012 (S.R. 2012 No. 94)
 The Foyle Area (Greenbraes Fishery Angling Permits) Regulations 2012 (S.R. 2012 No. 95)
 The Fair Employment (Specification of Public Authorities) (Amendment) Order (Northern Ireland) 2012 (S.R. 2012 No. 96)
 The Guaranteed Minimum Pensions Increase Order (Northern Ireland) 2012 (S.R. 2012 No. 97)
 The Occupational and Personal Pension Schemes (Levies) (Amendment) Regulations (Northern Ireland) 2012 (S.R. 2012 No. 98)
 The Pension Protection Fund and Occupational Pension Schemes (Levy Ceiling and Compensation Cap) Order (Northern Ireland) 2012 (S.R. 2012 No. 99)
 The Social Security (Industrial Injuries) (Prescribed Diseases) (Amendment) Regulations (Northern Ireland) 2012 (S.R. 2012 No. 100)

101-200 

 The Grange Lodge, Antrim (Abandonment) Order (Northern Ireland) 2012 (S.R. 2012 No. 101)
 The Parking and Waiting Restrictions (Strabane) (Amendment) Order (Northern Ireland) 2012 (S.R. 2012 No. 102)
 The Shore Road and Northwood Parade, Belfast (Abandonment) Order (Northern Ireland) 2012 (S.R. 2012 No. 103)
 The Loopland Court, Belfast (Abandonment) Order (Northern Ireland) 2012 (S.R. 2012 No. 104)
 The High Hedges (Fee Transfer) Regulations (Northern Ireland) 2012 (S.R. 2012 No. 105)
 Rates (Small Business Hereditament Relief) (Amendment) Regulations (Northern Ireland) 2012 (S.R. 2012 No. 106)
 The Social Security (Claims and Payments) (Amendment) Regulations (Northern Ireland) 2012 (S.R. 2012 No. 107)
 The Social Security (Recovery) (Amendment) Regulations (Northern Ireland) 2012 (S.R. 2012 No. 108)
 The Social Security (Credits) (Amendment) Regulations (Northern Ireland) 2012 (S.R. 2012 No. 109)
 The Pensions (2005 Order) (Disclosure of Restricted Information by the Pensions Regulator) (Amendment) Order (Northern Ireland) 2012 (S.R. 2012 No. 110)
 The Recovery of Health Services Charges (Amounts) (Amendment) Regulations (Northern Ireland) 2012 (S.R. 2012 No. 111)
 The Waste (Fees and Charges) (Amendment) Regulations (Northern Ireland) 2012 (S.R. 2012 No. 112)
 The Pensions (Institute and Faculty of Actuaries and Consultation by Employers) (Amendment) Regulations (Northern Ireland) 2012 (S.R. 2012 No. 113)
 The Dog Control Orders (Prescribed Offences and Penalties, etc.) Regulations (Northern Ireland) 2012 (S.R. 2012 No. 114)
 The Pensions (2008 Act) (Commencement No. 3) Order (Northern Ireland) 2012 (S.R. 2012 No. 115 (C. 11))
 The Social Security Benefits Up-rating Order (Northern Ireland) 2012 (S.R. 2012 No. 116)
 The Social Security Benefits Up-rating Regulations (Northern Ireland) 2012 (S.R. 2012 No. 117)
 The Social Security (Industrial Injuries) (Dependency) (Permitted Earnings Limits) Order (Northern Ireland) 2012 (S.R. 2012 No. 118)
 The Pensions (2008 No. 2 Act) (Commencement No. 7) Order (Northern Ireland) 2012 (S.R. 2012 No. 119 (C. 12))
 The Pensions (2008 Act) (Abolition of Contracting-out for Defined Contribution Pension Schemes) (Consequential Provisions) Regulations (Northern Ireland) 2012 (S.R. 2012 No. 120)
 The Social Security (Miscellaneous Amendments) Regulations (Northern Ireland) 2012 (S.R. 2012 No. 121)
 The Valuation Tribunal (Amendment) Rules (Northern Ireland) 2012 (S.R. 2012 No. 122)
 The Identification and Traceability of Explosives (Amendment) (Northern Ireland) Regulations 2012 (S.R. 2012 No. 123)
 The Pensions (2008 No. 2 Act) (Abolition of Protected Rights) (Consequential Provisions) Order (Northern Ireland) 2012 (S.R. 2012 No. 124)
 The Occupational Pension Schemes (Contracting-out and Modification of Schemes) (Amendment) Regulations (Northern Ireland) 2012 (S.R. 2012 No. 125)
 The Teachers’ Superannuation (Amendment) Regulations (Northern Ireland) 2012 (S.R. 2012 No. 126)
 The Road Races (Croft Hill Climb) Order (Northern Ireland) 2012 (S.R. 2012 No. 127)
 The Road Races (Circuit of Ireland International Rally) Order (Northern Ireland) 2012 (S.R. 2012 No. 128)
 The College Avenue, Belfast (Stopping-Up) Order (Northern Ireland) 2012 (S.R. 2012 No. 129)
 The Food Hygiene (Amendment) Regulations (Northern Ireland) 2012 (S.R. 2012 No. 130)
 The Dogs (Amendment) (2011 Act) (Commencement No.3) Order (Northern Ireland) 2012 (S.R. 2012 No. 131 (C. 13))
 The Dogs (Licensing and Identification) Regulations (Northern Ireland) 2012 (S.R. 2012 No. 132)
 The Plant Health (Amendment) Order (Northern Ireland) 2012 (S.R. 2012 No. 133)
 The Medicines (Products for Human Use) (Fees) Regulations 2012 (S.R. 2012 No. 134)
 The Criminal Aid Certificates Rules (Northern Ireland) 2012 (S.R. 2012 No. 135)
 The Education (Student Loans) (Repayment) (Amendment) Regulations (Northern Ireland) 2012 (S.R. 2012 No. 136)
 Pensions Increase (Review) Order (Northern Ireland) 2012 (S.R. 2012 No. 137)
 The Code of Practice (Time Off for Trade Union Duties and Activities) (Appointed Day) Order (Northern Ireland) 2012 (S.R. 2012 No. 138)
 Registered Rents (Increase) Order (Northern Ireland) 2012 (S.R. 2012 No. 139)
 The Social Security (Suspension of Payment of Benefits and Miscellaneous Amendments) Regulations (Northern Ireland) 2012 (S.R. 2012 No. 140)
 The Fuel Payments Scheme (Patients Receiving Treatment for Cancer) Regulations (Northern Ireland) 2012 (S.R. 2012 No. 141)
 The Justice (2011 Act) (Commencement No. 3) Order (Northern Ireland) 2012 (S.R. 2012 No. 142 (C. 14))
 The Parking and Waiting Restrictions (Rathfriland) Order (Northern Ireland) 2012 (S.R. 2012 No. 143)
 The Road Races (Cookstown 100) Order (Northern Ireland) 2012 (S.R. 2012 No. 144)
 The Road Races (Tandragee 100) Order (Northern Ireland) 2012 (S.R. 2012 No. 145)
 The Road Traffic (Immobilisation, Removal and Disposal of Vehicles) (Amendment) Regulations (Northern Ireland) 2012 (S.R. 2012 No. 146)
 The Rates (Deferment) (Revocation and Savings) Regulations (Northern Ireland) 2012 (S.R. 2012 No. 147)
 The Motor Vehicles Testing (Amendment) Regulations (Northern Ireland) 2012 (S.R. 2012 No. 148)
 The Goods Vehicles (Testing) (Amendment) Regulations (Northern Ireland) 2012 (S.R. 2012 No. 149)
 The Motor Vehicles (Construction and Use) (Amendment) Regulations (Northern Ireland) 2012 (S.R. 2012 No. 150)
 The Firefighters’ Pension Scheme (Contributions) (Revocation) Order (Northern Ireland) 2012 (S.R. 2012 No. 151)
 The New Firefighters’ Pension Scheme (Contributions) (Revocation) Order (Northern Ireland) 2012 (S.R. 2012 No. 152)
 The Welfare of Animals (Permitted Procedures by Lay Persons) Regulations (Northern Ireland) 2012 (S.R. 2012 No. 153)
 The Welfare of Animals (2011 Act) (Commencement and Transitional Provisions No.2) Order (Northern Ireland) 2012 (S.R. 2012 No. 154 (C. 15))
 The Jobseeker's Allowance (Domestic Violence) (Amendment) Regulations (Northern Ireland) 2012 (S.R. 2012 No. 155)
 Welfare of Farmed Animals Regulations (Northern Ireland) 2012 (S.R. 2012 No. 156)
 The Housing Benefit (Executive Determinations) (Amendment) Regulations (Northern Ireland) 2012 (S.R. 2012 No. 157)
 The Zoonoses (Fees) (Amendment) Regulations (Northern Ireland) 2012 (S.R. 2012 No. 158)
 The Fuel Allowance Payments Scheme Regulations (Northern Ireland) 2012 (S.R. 2012 No. 159)
 The Employment and Support Allowance (Amendment of Linking Rules) Regulations (Northern Ireland) 2012 (S.R. 2012 No. 160)
 The Firefighters’ Pension Scheme (Amendment) Order (Northern Ireland) 2012 (S.R. 2012 No. 161)
 The New Firefighters’ Pension Scheme (Amendment) Order (Northern Ireland) 2012 (S.R. 2012 No. 162)
 The Child Support (Miscellaneous Amendments) Regulations (Northern Ireland) 2012 (S.R. 2012 No. 163)
 The Road Races (Spamount Hill Climb) Order (Northern Ireland) 2012 (S.R. 2012 No. 164)
 The Waiting Restrictions (Bangor) Order (Northern Ireland) 2012 (S.R. 2012 No. 165)
 The Roads (Speed Limit) Order (Northern Ireland) 2012 (S.R. 2012 No. 166)
 The Health Care (Reimbursement of the Cost of EEA Services etc.) Regulations (Northern Ireland) 2012 (S.R. 2012 No. 167)
 The Misuse of Drugs (Amendment) Regulations (Northern Ireland) 2012 (S.R. 2012 No. 168)
 The Road Transport (Working Time) (Amendment) Regulations (Northern Ireland) 2012 (S.R. 2012 No. 169)
 The Motor Vehicles (Driving Licences) (Amendment) Regulations (Northern Ireland) 2012 (S.R. 2012 No. 170)
 The Road Races (Drumhorc Hill Climb) Order (Northern Ireland) 2012 (S.R. 2012 No. 171)
 The Trunk Road T9 (Coleman's Corner to Ballyrickard Road) Order (Northern Ireland) 2012 (S.R. 2012 No. 172)
 The Whole of Government Accounts (Designation of Bodies) Order (Northern Ireland) 2012 (S.R. 2012 No. 173)
 The Private Accesses (A8 Belfast to Larne Dual Carriageway (Coleman's Corner to Ballyrickard Road)) Stopping-Up Order (Northern Ireland) 2012 (S.R. 2012 No. 174)
 The Road Races (North West 200) Order (Northern Ireland) 2012 (S.R. 2012 No. 175)
 The Diseases of Animals (Importation of Machinery and Vehicles) Order (Northern Ireland) 2012 (S.R. 2012 No. 176)
 The Carriage of Explosives (Amendment) Regulations (Northern Ireland) 2012 (S.R. 2012 No. 177)
 Police Service of Northern Ireland (Amendment) Regulations 2012 (S.R. 2012 No. 178)
 The Control of Asbestos Regulations (Northern Ireland) 2012 (S.R. 2012 No. 179)
 The Food Additives (Amendment) and the Extraction Solvents in Food (Amendment) Regulations (Northern Ireland) 2012 (S.R. 2012 No. 180)
 The Jobseeker's Allowance (Amendment) Regulations (Northern Ireland) 2012 (S.R. 2012 No. 181)
 The Children's Homes (Amendment) Regulations (Northern Ireland) 2012 (S.R. 2012 No. 182)
 Local Government Pension Scheme (Amendment) Regulations (Northern Ireland) 2012 (S.R. 2012 No. 183)
 The Student Fees (Amounts) (Amendment) Regulations (Northern Ireland) 2012 (S.R. 2012 No. 184)
 The Potatoes Originating in Egypt (Amendment) Regulations (Northern Ireland) 2012 (S.R. 2012 No. 185)
 The Building Regulations (2009 Amendment Act) (Commencement No. 2) Order (Northern Ireland) 2012 (S.R. 2012 No. 186 (C. 16))
 The Building Regulations (1979 Order) (Commencement No. 3) Order (Northern Ireland) 2012 (S.R. 2012 No. 187 (C. 17))
 The Penalty Notices (Justice Act (Northern Ireland) 2011) (Enforcement of Fines) Regulations (Northern Ireland) 2012 (S.R. 2012 No. 188)
 The Magistrates’ Courts (Amendment) Rules (Northern Ireland) 2012 (S.R. 2012 No. 189)
 The Magistrates’ Courts (Declarations of Parentage) (Amendment) Rules (Northern Ireland) 2012 (S.R. 2012 No. 190)
 The Prison Service (Pay Review Body) Regulations (Northern Ireland) 2012 (S.R. 2012 No. 191)
 The Building Regulations (Northern Ireland) 2012 (S.R. 2012 No. 192)
 The Cycle Routes (Amendment No. 2) Order (Northern Ireland) 2012 (S.R. 2012 No. 193)
 The Parking Places (Disabled Persons’ Vehicles) (Amendment No. 3) Order (Northern Ireland) 2012 (S.R. 2012 No. 194)
 The Waiting Restrictions (Lisburn) Order (Northern Ireland) 2012 (S.R. 2012 No. 195)
 The Durham Street and Hamill Street - Killen Street, Belfast (Stopping-Up) Order (Northern Ireland) 2012 (S.R. 2012 No. 196)
 The Control of Traffic (Belfast City Centre) Order (Northern Ireland) 2012 (S.R. 2012 No. 197)
 The Bus Lanes (Belfast City Centre) Order (Northern Ireland) 2012 (S.R. 2012 No. 198)
 The Waiting Restrictions (Belfast City Centre) Order (Northern Ireland) 2012 (S.R. 2012 No. 199)
 The Cycle Routes (Amendment No. 3) Order (Northern Ireland) 2012 (S.R. 2012 No. 200)

201-300 

 The Parking Places on Roads (Coaches) Order (Northern Ireland) 2012 (S.R. 2012 No. 201)
 The Parking Places on Roads (Belfast City Centre) Order (Northern Ireland) 2012 (S.R. 2012 No. 202)
 The Penalty Charges (Prescribed Amounts) (Amendment) Regulations (Northern Ireland) 2012 (S.R. 2012 No. 203)
 The Road Races (Mid-Antrim 150) Order (Northern Ireland) 2012 (S.R. 2012 No. 204)
 The Road Races (Cairncastle Hill Climb) Order (Northern Ireland) 2012 (S.R. 2012 No. 205)
 The Road Races (Bush, Dungannon) Order (Northern Ireland) 2012 (S.R. 2012 No. 206)
 The Route U5160, Carnbane Industrial Estate, Newry (Abandonment) Order (Northern Ireland) 2012 (S.R. 2012 No. 207)
 The Route B30 Newry Road, Crossmaglen (Abandonment) Order (Northern Ireland) 2012 (S.R. 2012 No. 208)
 The Marine Highway, Carrickfergus (Abandonment) Order (Northern Ireland) 2012 (S.R. 2012 No. 209)
 The Longlands Avenue, Newtownabbey (Abandonment) Order (Northern Ireland) 2012 (S.R. 2012 No. 210)
 The Browning Drive, Londonderry (Abandonment) Order (Northern Ireland) 2012 (S.R. 2012 No. 211)
 The Misuse of Drugs (Designation) (Amendment) Order (Northern Ireland) 2012 (S.R. 2012 No. 212)
 The Misuse of Drugs (Amendment No.2) Regulations (Northern Ireland) 2012 (S.R. 2012 No. 213)
 The Justice (2011 Act) (Commencement No. 4 and Transitory Provision) Order (Northern Ireland) 2012 (S.R. 2012 No. 214 (C. 18))
 The Statistics and Registration Service Act 2007 (Disclosure of Social Security Information) Regulations (Northern Ireland) 2012 (S.R. 2012 No. 215)
 The Off-Street Parking (Amendment) Order (Northern Ireland) 2012 (S.R. 2012 No. 216)
 The Valuation Tribunal (Amendment No. 2) Rules (Northern Ireland) 2012 (S.R. 2012 No. 217)
 The Quality of Bathing Water (Amendment) Regulations (Northern Ireland) 2012 (S.R. 2012 No. 218)
 The Safety of Sports Grounds (Fees and Appeals) (Amendment) Regulations (Northern Ireland) 2012 (S.R. 2012 No. 219)
 The Waiting Restrictions (Larne) Order (Northern Ireland) 2012 (S.R. 2012 No. 220)
 The Roads (Speed Limit) (No. 2) Order (Northern Ireland) 2012 (S.R. 2012 No. 221)
 The Parking Places on Roads (Larne) (Amendment) Order (Northern Ireland) 2012 (S.R. 2012 No. 222)
 The Parking Places on Roads (Toome) Order (Northern Ireland) 2012 (S.R. 2012 No. 223)
 The Parking and Waiting Restrictions (Strabane) (Amendment No. 2) Order (Northern Ireland) 2012 (S.R. 2012 No. 224)
 The Loading Bays and Parking Places on Roads (Amendment) Order (Northern Ireland) 2012 (S.R. 2012 No. 225)
 The Police and Criminal Evidence (1989 Order) (Codes of Practice) (Temporary Modification to Code A) Order (Northern Ireland) 2012 (S.R. 2012 No. 226)
 The Parking Places (Disabled Persons' Vehicles) (Amendment No. 4) Order (Northern Ireland) 2012 (S.R. 2012 No. 227)
 The Road Races (Down Special Stages Rally) Order (Northern Ireland) 2012 (S.R. 2012 No. 228)
 The Foster Placement (Children) (Amendment) Regulations (Northern Ireland) 2012 (S.R. 2012 No. 229)
 The Fluorinated Greenhouse Gases (Amendment) Regulations (Northern Ireland) 2012 (S.R. 2012 No. 230)
 The Nitrates Action Programme (Amendment) Regulations (Northern Ireland) 2012 (S.R. 2012 No. 231)
 The Automatic Enrolment (Miscellaneous Amendments) Regulations (Northern Ireland) 2012 (S.R. 2012 No. 232)
 The Pensions (2012 Act) (Commencement No. 1) Order (Northern Ireland) 2012 (S.R. 2012 No. 233 (C. 19))
 The Pensions (2008 Act) (Commencement No. 4) Order (Northern Ireland) 2012 (S.R. 2012 No. 234 (C. 20))
 The M2 Motorway at Whitla Street, Belfast (Abandonment) Order (Northern Ireland) 2012 (S.R. 2012 No. 235)
 The Pensions (2008 No. 2 Act) (Commencement No. 8) Order (Northern Ireland) 2012 (S.R. 2012 No. 236 (C. 21))
 The Occupational and Personal Pension Schemes (Automatic Enrolment) (Amendment) Regulations (Northern Ireland) 2012 (S.R. 2012 No. 237)
 The Occupational and Personal Pension Schemes (Automatic Enrolment) (Amendment No. 2) Regulations (Northern Ireland) 2012 (S.R. 2012 No. 238)
 Pre-School Education in Schools (Admissions Criteria) (Amendment) Regulations (Northern Ireland) 2012 (S.R. 2012 No. 239)
 The Automatic Enrolment (Earnings Trigger and Qualifying Earnings Band) Order (Northern Ireland) 2012 (S.R. 2012 No. 240)
 The Plant Health (Amendment No.2) Order (Northern Ireland) 2012 (S.R. 2012 No. 241)
 The Road Races (Armoy Motorcycle Race) Order (Northern Ireland) 2012 (S.R. 2012 No. 242)
 The Waiting Restrictions (Londonderry) (Amendment) Order (Northern Ireland) 2012 (S.R. 2012 No. 243)
 The Tobacco Advertising and Promotion (Specialist Tobacconists) Regulations (Northern Ireland) 2012 (S.R. 2012 No. 244)
 The Industrial Training Levy (Construction Industry) Order (Northern Ireland) 2012 (S.R. 2012 No. 245)
 The Tobacco Advertising and Promotion (Display) Regulations (Northern Ireland) 2012 (S.R. 2012 No. 246)
 The Goods Vehicles (Licensing of Operators) (2010 Act) (Commencement No. 1) Order (Northern Ireland) 2012 (S.R. 2012 No. 247 (C. 22))
 The Community Drivers’ Hours Regulations (Northern Ireland) 2012 (S.R. 2012 No. 248)
 The Licensing (Requirements for Conference Centre) (Amendment) Regulations (Northern Ireland) 2012 (S.R. 2012 No. 249)
 The Smoke Control Areas (Exempted Fireplaces) Regulations (Northern Ireland) 2012 (S.R. 2012 No. 250)
 The Loading Bays on Roads (Amendment No. 2) Order (Northern Ireland) 2012 (S.R. 2012 No. 251)
 The Traffic Weight Restriction (Amendment) Order (Northern Ireland) 2012 (S.R. 2012 No. 252)
 The Off-Street Parking (Amendment No. 2) Order (Northern Ireland) 2012 (S.R. 2012 No. 253)
 Agriculture (Student fees)(Amendment) Regulations (Northern Ireland) 2012 (S.R. 2012 No. 254)
 The Health and Safety (Fees) Regulations (Northern Ireland) 2012 (S.R. 2012 No. 255)
 The Goods Vehicles (Licensing of Operators) (Exemption) Regulations (Northern Ireland) 2012 (S.R. 2012 No. 256)
 The Goods Vehicles (Qualifications of Operators) Regulations (Northern Ireland) 2012 (S.R. 2012 No. 257)
 The Goods Vehicles (Enforcement Powers) Regulations (Northern Ireland) 2012 (S.R. 2012 No. 258)
 Optical Charges and Payments (Amendment) Regulations (Northern Ireland) 2012 (S.R. 2012 No. 259)
 The Goods Vehicles (Licensing of Operators) (Fees) Regulations (Northern Ireland) 2012 (S.R. 2012 No. 260)
 The Goods Vehicles (Licensing of Operators) Regulations (Northern Ireland) 2012 (S.R. 2012 No. 261)
 The Goods Vehicles (Licensing of Operators) (2010 Act) (Commencement No. 2 and Transitional Provisions) Order (Northern Ireland) 2012 (S.R. 2012 No. 262 (C. 23))
 The Race Relations Order 1997 (Amendment) Order (Northern Ireland) 2012 (S.R. 2012 No. 263)
 The Social Security (Industrial Injuries) (Prescribed Diseases) (Amendment No. 2) Regulations (Northern Ireland) 2012 (S.R. 2012 No. 264)
 The Pensions (2012 Act) (Commencement No. 2) Order (Northern Ireland) 2012 (S.R. 2012 No. 265 (C. 24))
 The Pensions (2008 No. 2 Act) (Commencement No. 9) Order (Northern Ireland) 2012 (S.R. 2012 No. 266 (C. 25))
 The Hybrid Schemes Quality Requirements Rules (Northern Ireland) 2012 (S.R. 2012 No. 267)
 The Criminal Legal Aid (Recovery of Defence Costs Orders) Rules (Northern Ireland) 2012 (S.R. 2012 No. 268)
 The Road Races (Eagles Rock Hill Climb) Order (Northern Ireland) 2012 (S.R. 2012 No. 269)
 The Pension Protection Fund (Miscellaneous Amendments) Regulations (Northern Ireland) 2012 (S.R. 2012 No. 270)
 Local Government Best Value (Exclusion of Non-commercial Considerations) Order (Northern Ireland) 2012 (S.R. 2012 No. 271)
 The Rules of the Court of Judicature (Northern Ireland) (Amendment) 2012 (S.R. 2012 No. 272)
 The Rules of the Court of Judicature (Northern Ireland) (Amendment No.2) 2012 (S.R. 2012 No. 273)
 The M3 Motorway at Titanic Quarter Railway Station, Belfast (Abandonment) Order (Northern Ireland) 2012 (S.R. 2012 No. 274)
 The Upper Dunmurry Lane, Dunmurry (Abandonment) Order (Northern Ireland) 2012 (S.R. 2012 No. 275)
 The Parking Places on Roads (Armagh) (Amendment) Order (Northern Ireland) 2012 (S.R. 2012 No. 276)
 The Prohibition of Right-Hand Turn (Enniskillen) Order (Northern Ireland) 2012 (S.R. 2012 No. 277)
 The Road Races (Craigantlet Hill Climb) Order (Northern Ireland) 2012 (S.R. 2012 No. 278)
 Local Government (Councillors’ Remuneration Panel) Regulations (Northern Ireland) 2012 (S.R. 2012 No. 279)
 The Food Hygiene (Amendment) (No. 2) Regulations (Northern Ireland) 2012 (S.R. 2012 No. 280)
 The Road Races (Garron Point Hill Climb) Order (Northern Ireland) 2012 (S.R. 2012 No. 281)
 The Road Races (Spelga Hill Climb) Order (Northern Ireland) 2012 (S.R. 2012 No. 282)
 Public Interest Disclosure (Prescribed Persons) (Amendment) Order (Northern Ireland) 2012 (S.R. 2012 No. 283)
 The Jobseeker's Allowance (Members of the Reserve Forces) Regulations (Northern Ireland) 2012 (S.R. 2012 No. 284)
 Superannuation (Charity Commission for Northern Ireland) Order (Northern Ireland) 2012 (S.R. 2012 No. 285)
 The Corporate Manslaughter and Corporate Homicide (2007 Act) (Commencement) Order (Northern Ireland) 2012 (S.R. 2012 No. 286 (C. 26))
 The Waiting Restrictions (Holywood) Order (Northern Ireland) 2012 (S.R. 2012 No. 287)
 The On-Street Parking (Amendment) Order (Northern Ireland) 2012 (S.R. 2012 No. 288)
 The Off-Street Parking (Amendment No. 3) Order (Northern Ireland) 2012 (S.R. 2012 No. 289)
 The Parking Places on Roads (Electric Vehicles) Order (Northern Ireland) 2012 (S.R. 2012 No. 290)
 The Road Races (Ulster Grand Prix Bike Week) Order (Northern Ireland) 2012 (S.R. 2012 No. 291)
 The Social Fund Maternity and Funeral Expenses (General) (Amendment) Regulations (Northern Ireland) 2012 (S.R. 2012 No. 292)
 The Planning (Fees) (Amendment) Regulations (Northern Ireland) 2012 (S.R. 2012 No. 293)
 The Pensions (Financial Reporting Council) (Amendment) Regulations (Northern Ireland) 2012 (S.R. 2012 No. 294)
 The Drumlin Road, Donaghcloney (Abandonment) Order (Northern Ireland) 2012 (S.R. 2012 No. 295)
 The A3 Northway, Portadown (Abandonment) Order (Northern Ireland) 2012 (S.R. 2012 No. 296)
 The Waiting Restrictions (Bushmills) Order (Northern Ireland) 2012 (S.R. 2012 No. 297)
 The Taxis (Bushmills) Order (Northern Ireland) 2012 (S.R. 2012 No. 298)
 The Marketing of Fresh Horticulture Produce (Amendment) Regulations (Northern Ireland) 2012 (S.R. 2012 No. 299)
 The Road Races (Ulster Rally) Order (Northern Ireland) 2012 (S.R. 2012 No. 300)

301-400 

 The Labour Relations Agency Arbitration Scheme Order (Northern Ireland) 2012 (S.R. 2012 No. 301)
 The Labour Relations Agency Arbitration Scheme (Jurisdiction) Order (Northern Ireland) 2012 (S.R. 2012 No. 302)
 The Trunk Road T3 (Western Transport Corridor) Order (Northern Ireland) 2012 (S.R. 2012 No. 303)
 The Private Accesses on the A5 Western Transport Corridor (Stopping-Up) Order (Northern Ireland) 2012 (S.R. 2012 No. 304)
 The Northern Ireland Poultry Health Assurance Scheme (Fees) Order (Northern Ireland) 2012 (S.R. 2012 No. 305)
 The Further Education (Student Support) (Eligibility) Regulations (Northern Ireland) 2012 (S.R. 2012 No. 306)
 The Health (2006 Act) (Commencement) Order (Northern Ireland) 2012 (S.R. 2012 No. 307 (C. 27))
 The Pharmacy (1976 Order) (Amendment) Order (Northern Ireland) 2012 (S.R. 2012 No. 308)
 The Council of the Pharmaceutical Society of Northern Ireland (Appointments and Procedure) Regulations (Northern Ireland) 2012 (S.R. 2012 No. 309)
 The Council of the Pharmaceutical Society of Northern Ireland (Statutory Committee, Scrutiny Committee and Advisers) Regulations (Northern Ireland) 2012 (S.R. 2012 No. 310)
 The Council of the Pharmaceutical Society of Northern Ireland (Fitness to Practise and Disqualification) Regulations (Northern Ireland) 2012 (S.R. 2012 No. 311)
 The Council of the Pharmaceutical Society of Northern Ireland (Continuing Professional Development) Regulations (Northern Ireland) 2012 (S.R. 2012 No. 312)
 The Taxis (2008 Act) (Commencement No. 2) Order (Northern Ireland) 2012 (S.R. 2012 No. 313 (C. 28))
 The Tuberculosis Control (Amendment) Order (Northern Ireland) 2012 (S.R. 2012 No. 314)
 The Brucellosis Control (Amendment) Order (Northern Ireland) 2012 (S.R. 2012 No. 315)
 The Taxi Operators Licensing Regulations (Northern Ireland) 2012 (S.R. 2012 No. 316)
 The Parking and Waiting Restrictions (Belfast) (Amendment No. 2) Order (Northern Ireland) 2012 (S.R. 2012 No. 317)
 Rehabilitation of Offenders (Exceptions) (Amendment) Order (Northern Ireland) 2012 (S.R. 2012 No. 318)
 The Safeguarding Vulnerable Groups (Prescribed Criteria and Miscellaneous Provisions) (Amendment) Regulations (Northern Ireland) 2012 (S.R. 2012 No. 319)
 The Safeguarding Vulnerable Groups (Miscellaneous Amendments) Order (Northern Ireland) 2012 (S.R. 2012 No. 320)
 The Police Act 1997 (Criminal Records) (Amendment No. 2) Regulations (Northern Ireland) 2012 (S.R. 2012 No. 321)
 The Safeguarding Vulnerable Groups (Miscellaneous Provisions) Order (Northern Ireland) 2012 (S.R. 2012 No. 322)
 The Safeguarding Vulnerable Groups (Miscellaneous Provisions) Regulations (Northern Ireland) 2012 (S.R. 2012 No. 323)
 The Safeguarding Board for Northern Ireland (Membership, Procedure, Functions and Committee) Regulations (Northern Ireland) 2012 (S.R. 2012 No. 324)
 The Sexual Offences Act 2003 (Prescribed Police Stations) Regulations (Northern Ireland) 2012 (S.R. 2012 No. 325)
 The Prohibition of Traffic (Rosemeount Gardens, Londonderry) Order (Northern Ireland) 2012 (S.R. 2012 No. 326)
 The On-Street Parking (Amendment No. 2) Order (Northern Ireland) 2012 (S.R. 2012 No. 327)
 The Goods Vehicles (Testing) (Fees) (Amendment) Regulations (Northern Ireland) 2012 (S.R. 2012 No. 328)
 The Planning (General Development) (Amendment) Order (Northern Ireland) 2012 (S.R. 2012 No. 329)
 The Safeguarding Vulnerable Groups (2007 Order) (Commencement No. 7) Order (Northern Ireland) 2012 (S.R. 2012 No. 330 (C. 29))
 The Occupational Pension Schemes (Disclosure of Information) (Amendment) Regulations (Northern Ireland) 2012 (S.R. 2012 No. 331)
 The Employers’ Duties (Implementation) (Amendment) Regulations (Northern Ireland) 2012 (S.R. 2012 No. 332)
 The Off-Street Parking (Amendment No. 4) Order (Northern Ireland) 2012 (S.R. 2012 No. 333)
 The Assembly Members (Independent Financial Review and Standards) (2011 Act) (Commencement) Order (Northern Ireland) 2012 (S.R. 2012 No. 334 (C. 30))
 The Alien and Locally Absent Species in Aquaculture Regulations (Northern Ireland) 2012 (S.R. 2012 No. 335)
 The Foyle and Carlingford Fisheries (2007 Order) (Commencement No. 2) Order (Northern Ireland) 2012 (S.R. 2012 No. 336 (C. 31))
 The Road Traffic (2007 Order) (Commencement No. 5) (Amendment) Order (Northern Ireland) 2012 (S.R. 2012 No. 337)
 The Safeguarding Board (2011 Act) (Commencement No. 1) Order (Northern Ireland) 2012 (S.R. 2012 No. 338 (C. 32))
 The Trunk Road T14 (A55 Knock Road, Belfast) Order (Northern Ireland) 2012 (S.R. 2012 No. 339)
 The Private Accesses at A55 Knock Road, Belfast (Stopping-Up) Order (Northern Ireland) 2012 (S.R. 2012 No. 340)
 The Tobacco Advertising and Promotion (Display of Prices) Regulations (Northern Ireland) 2012 (S.R. 2012 No. 341)
 The Cycle Routes (Amendment No. 4) Order (Northern Ireland) 2012 (S.R. 2012 No. 342)
 The Waiting Restrictions (John Street, Castlederg) Order (Northern Ireland) 2012 (S.R. 2012 No. 343)
 The Waiting Restrictions (Springfield Road, Belfast) Order (Northern Ireland) 2012 (S.R. 2012 No. 344)
 The Roads (Speed Limit) (No. 3) Order (Northern Ireland) 2012 (S.R. 2012 No. 345)
 The Parking Places and Loading Bays on Roads (Londonderry) (Amendment No. 2) Order (Northern Ireland) 2012 (S.R. 2012 No. 346)
 The Parking Places (Disabled Persons' Vehicles) (Amendment No. 5) Order (Northern Ireland) 2012 (S.R. 2012 No. 347)
 The On-Street Parking (Amendment No. 3) Order (Northern Ireland) 2012 (S.R. 2012 No. 348)
 The Mental Health (1986 Order) (Commencement No. 5) Order (Northern Ireland) 2012 (S.R. 2012 No. 349 (C. 33))
 The Waiting Restrictions (Dundonald) Order (Northern Ireland) 2012 (S.R. 2012 No. 350)
 The Waiting Restrictions (Dungannon) (Amendment) Order (Northern Ireland) 2012 (S.R. 2012 No. 351)
 The Waiting Restrictions (Londonderry) (Amendment No. 2) Order (Northern Ireland) 2012 (S.R. 2012 No. 352)
 The Cycle Routes (Amendment No. 5) Order (Northern Ireland) 2012 (S.R. 2012 No. 353)
 The Motor Vehicles (Driving Licences) (Fees) (Amendment) Regulations (Northern Ireland) 2012 (S.R. 2012 No. 354)
 The Motor Vehicles (Driving Licences) (Amendment No. 2) Regulations (Northern Ireland) 2012 (S.R. 2012 No. 355)
 The Parking and Waiting Restrictions (Newtownards) Order (Northern Ireland) 2012 (S.R. 2012 No. 356)
 The Loading Bays on Roads (Amendment No. 3) Order (Northern Ireland) 2012 (S.R. 2012 No. 357)
 The Parking Places on Roads (Kilkeel) (No. 2) Order (Northern Ireland) 2012 (S.R. 2012 No. 358)
 The Tullynacross Road, Lisburn (Abandonment) Order (Northern Ireland) 2012 (S.R. 2012 No. 359)
 The Templemore Street, Belfast (Abandonment) Order (Northern Ireland) 2012 (S.R. 2012 No. 360)
 The C156 (Unnamed road), Moyraverty, Craigavon (Abandonment) Order (Northern Ireland) 2012 (S.R. 2012 No. 361)
 The Waiting Restrictions (Lisburn) (No. 2) Order (Northern Ireland) 2012 (S.R. 2012 No. 362)
 The Loading Bays on Roads (Amendment No. 4) Order (Northern Ireland) 2012 (S.R. 2012 No. 363)
 The Prohibition of Waiting (Amendment) Order (Northern Ireland) 2012 (S.R. 2012 No. 364)
 The Scheme for Construction Contracts in Northern Ireland (Amendment) Regulations (Northern Ireland) 2012 (S.R. 2012 No. 365)
 The Construction Contracts Exclusion Order (Northern Ireland) 2012 (S.R. 2012 No. 366)
 The Construction Contracts (2011 Act) (Commencement) Order (Northern Ireland) 2012 (S.R. 2012 No. 367 (C. 34))
 The Conservation (Natural Habitats, etc.) (Amendment) Regulations (Northern Ireland) 2012 (S.R. 2012 No. 368)
 The Social Fund (Cold Weather Payments) (General) (Amendment) Regulations (Northern Ireland) 2012 (S.R. 2012 No. 369)
 The Parking Places (Disabled Persons' Vehicles) (Amendment No. 6) Order (Northern Ireland) 2012 (S.R. 2012 No. 370)
 The Loading Bays and Parking Places on Roads (Amendment No. 2) Order (Northern Ireland) 2012 (S.R. 2012 No. 371)
 The Pensions (2008 No. 2 Act) (Commencement No. 10 and Supplementary Provisions) Order (Northern Ireland) 2012 (S.R. 2012 No. 372 (C. 35))
 The Tenancy Deposit Schemes Regulations (Northern Ireland) 2012 (S.R. 2012 No. 373)
 The Child Support (Great Britain Reciprocal Arrangements) (Amendment) Regulations (Northern Ireland) 2012 (S.R. 2012 No. 374)
 The Building (Amendment) Regulations (Northern Ireland) 2012 (S.R. 2012 No. 375)
 The Police and Criminal Evidence (Northern Ireland) Order 1989 (Codes of Practice) (Revision of Codes C, E, F and H) Order 2012 (S.R. 2012 No. 376)
 The Social Security (Miscellaneous Amendments No. 2) Regulations (Northern Ireland) 2012 (S.R. 2012 No. 377)
 The Travelling Expenses and Remission of Charges (Amendment No. 2) Regulations (Northern Ireland) 2012 (S.R. 2012 No. 378)
 The Smoke Control Areas (Exempted Fireplaces) (No. 2) Regulations (Northern Ireland) 2012 (S.R. 2012 No. 379)
 The Social Security (Habitual Residence) (Amendment) Regulations (Northern Ireland) 2012 (S.R. 2012 No. 380)
 THE ELECTRICITY SAFETY, QUALITY AND CONTINUITY REGULATIONS (NORTHERN IRELAND) 2012 (S.R. 2012 No. 381)
 The Off-Street Parking (Amendment No. 5) Order (Northern Ireland) 2012 (S.R. 2012 No. 382)
 The Bluetongue (Amendment) Regulations (Northern Ireland) 2012 (S.R. 2012 No. 383)
 The Materials and Articles in Contact with Food Regulations (Northern Ireland) 2012 (S.R. 2012 No. 384)
 Electricity (Priority Dispatch) Regulations (Northern Ireland) 2012 (S.R. 2012 No. 385)
 The Welfare of Animals (2011 Act) (Commencement No. 3) Order (Northern Ireland) 2012 (S.R. 2012 No. 386 (C. 36))
 The Welfare of Animals (Docking of Working Dogs’ Tails and Miscellaneous Amendments) Regulations (Northern Ireland) 2012 (S.R. 2012 No. 387)
 Commissioner for Older People Act 2011(Commencement) Order (Northern Ireland) 2012 (S.R. 2012 No. 388 (C. 37))
 The Health (2009 Act) (Commencement No. 2) Order (Northern Ireland) 2012 (S.R. 2012 No. 389 (C. 38))
 The Occupational and Personal Pension Schemes (Automatic Enrolment) (Amendment No. 3) Regulations (Northern Ireland) 2012 (S.R. 2012 No. 390)
 Legal Aid (General) (Amendment) Regulations (Northern Ireland) 2012 (S.R. 2012 No. 391)
 The Plant Health (Amendment No.3) Order (Northern Ireland) 2012 (S.R. 2012 No. 392)
 Superannuation (Commission for Victims and Survivors for Northern Ireland) Order (Northern Ireland) 2012 (S.R. 2012 No. 393)
 The Social Security (Credits) (Amendment No. 2) Regulations (Northern Ireland) 2012 (S.R. 2012 No. 394)
 The Firearms (Northern Ireland) Order 2004 (Amendment) Regulations 2012 (S.R. 2012 No. 395)
 The Renewable Heat Incentive Scheme Regulations (Northern Ireland) 2012 (S.R. 2012 No. 396)
 Fisheries (Amendment) Regulations (Northern Ireland) 2012 (S.R. 2012 No. 397)
 The Education (Student Support) (No. 2) Regulations (Northern Ireland) 2009 (Amendment) (No. 2) Regulations (Northern Ireland) 2012 (S.R. 2012 No. 398)
 The Smoke Control Areas (Authorised Fuels) Regulations (Northern Ireland) 2012 (S.R. 2012 No. 399)
 The Plant Health (Wood and Bark) (Amendment) Order (Northern Ireland) 2012 (S.R. 2012 No. 400)

401-500 

 Mental Health (Private Hospitals) (Fees) Regulations (Northern Ireland) 2012 (S.R. 2012 No. 401)
 The County Court (Amendment) Rules (Northern Ireland) 2012 (S.R. 2012 No. 402)
 Mental Health (Private Hospitals) Regulations (Northern Ireland) 2012 (S.R. 2012 No. 403)
 The Parking Places on Roads (Belfast) Order (Northern Ireland) 2012 (S.R. 2012 No. 404)
 Licensing and Registration of Clubs (Amendment) (2011 Act) (Commencement No.4) Order (Northern Ireland) 2012 (S.R. 2012 No. 405 (C. 39))
 The Civil Registration (2011 Act) (Commencement No. 2) Order (Northern Ireland) 2012 (S.R. 2012 No. 406 (C. 40))
 The Juries (Amendment) Regulations (Northern Ireland) 2012 (S.R. 2012 No. 407)
 The Civil Registration Regulations (Northern Ireland) 2012 (S.R. 2012 No. 408)
 The Off-Street Parking (Amendment No. 6) Order (Northern Ireland) 2012 (S.R. 2012 No. 409)
 The Roads (Speed Limit) (No. 4) Order (Northern Ireland) 2012 (S.R. 2012 No. 410)
 The Control of Traffic (Apsley Street, Belfast) Order (Northern Ireland) 2012 (S.R. 2012 No. 411)
 The Bus Lanes (East Bridge Street and Cromac Street, Belfast) (Amendment) Order (Northern Ireland) 2012 (S.R. 2012 No. 412)
 The International Recovery of Maintenance (Hague Convention 2007 etc.) Regulations (Northern Ireland) 2012 (S.R. 2012 No. 413)
 The Magistrates’ Courts (Civil Jurisdiction and Judgments Act 1982) (Amendment) Rules (Northern Ireland) 2012 (S.R. 2012 No. 414)
 The Magistrates’ Courts (Amendment No.2) Rules (Northern Ireland) 2012 (S.R. 2012 No. 415)
 Cattle Identification (Miscellaneous Amendments) Regulations (Northern Ireland) 2012 (S.R. 2012 No. 416)
 The Local Government (2005 Order) (Commencement No. 3) Order (Northern Ireland) 2012 (S.R. 2012 No. 417 (C. 41))
 The Cycle Routes (Amendment No. 6) Order (Northern Ireland) 2012 (S.R. 2012 No. 418)
 The Legal Advice and Assistance (Amendment) Regulations (Northern Ireland) 2012 (S.R. 2012 No. 419)
 Licensing and Registration of Clubs (Amendment) (2011 Act) (Commencement No.5) Order (Northern Ireland) 2012 (S.R. 2012 No. 420 (C. 42))
 Local Government (Boundaries) Order (Northern Ireland) 2012 (S.R. 2012 No. 421)
 Local Government (Indemnities for Members and Officers) Order (Northern Ireland) 2012 (S.R. 2012 No. 422)
 The Child Maintenance (2008 Act) (Commencement No. 9) Order (Northern Ireland) 2012 (S.R. 2012 No. 423 (C. 43))
 The Welfare Reform (2010 Act) (Commencement No. 5) Order (Northern Ireland) 2012 (S.R. 2012 No. 424 (C. 44))
 The Waiting Restrictions (Ahoghill) Order (Northern Ireland) 2012 (S.R. 2012 No. 425)
 The Occupational Pensions (Revaluation) Order (Northern Ireland) 2012 (S.R. 2012 No. 426)
 The Child Support Maintenance Calculation Regulations (Northern Ireland) 2012 (S.R. 2012 No. 427)
 The Child Support Maintenance (Changes to Basic Rate Calculation and Minimum Amount of Liability) Regulations (Northern Ireland) 2012 (S.R. 2012 No. 428)
 Allocation of Housing and Homelessness (Eligibility) (Amendment) Regulations (Northern Ireland) 2012 (S.R. 2012 No. 429)
 The Magistrates’ Courts (Costs in Criminal Cases) (Amendment) Rules (Northern Ireland) 2012 (S.R. 2012 No. 430)
 The Rules of the Court of Judicature (Northern Ireland) (Amendment No.3) 2012 (S.R. 2012 No. 431)
 The Loading Bays on Roads (Amendment No. 5) Order (Northern Ireland) 2012 (S.R. 2012 No. 432)
 The Parking Places, Loading Bay and Waiting Restrictions (Randalstown) Order (Northern Ireland) 2012 (S.R. 2012 No. 433)
 The Parking Places on Roads (Donaghmore) Order (Northern Ireland) 2012 (S.R. 2012 No. 434)
 The Licensing (Irresponsible Drinks Promotions) Regulations (Northern Ireland) 2012 (S.R. 2012 No. 435)
 The Registration of Clubs (Irresponsible Drinks Promotions) Regulations (Northern Ireland) 2012 (S.R. 2012 No. 436)
 The Producer Responsibility Obligations (Packaging Waste) (Amendment) Regulations (Northern Ireland) 2012 (S.R. 2012 No. 437)
 The Child Support (Meaning of Child and New Calculation Rules) (Consequential and Miscellaneous Amendments) Regulations (Northern Ireland) 2012 (S.R. 2012 No. 438)
 The Child Support (Management of Payments and Arrears) (Amendment) Regulations (Northern Ireland) 2012 (S.R. 2012 No. 439)
 The Child Maintenance (2008 Act) (Commencement No. 10 and Transitional Provisions) Order (Northern Ireland) 2012 (S.R. 2012 No. 440 (C. 45))
 The Strangford Lough (Sea Fishing Exclusion Zones) Regulations (Northern Ireland) 2012 (S.R. 2012 No. 441)
 The Water Framework Directive (Priority Substances and Classification) (Amendment) Regulations (Northern Ireland) 2012 (S.R. 2012 No. 442)
 General Register Office (Fees) Order (Northern Ireland) 2012 (S.R. 2012 No. 443)
 The Education (Levels of Progression for Key Stages 1, 2 and 3) Order (Northern Ireland) 2012 (S.R. 2012 No. 444)
 Air Passenger Duty (2012 Act) (Commencement) Order (Northern Ireland) 2012 (S.R. 2012 No. 445 (C. 46))
 The Police Act 1997 (Criminal Records) (Amendment No. 3) Regulations (Northern Ireland) 2012 (S.R. 2012 No. 446)
 The Parking and Waiting Restrictions (Ballymena) (Amendment) Order (Northern Ireland) 2012 (S.R. 2012 No. 447)
 The Greystone Road, Limavady (Abandonment) Order (Northern Ireland) 2012 (S.R. 2012 No. 448)
 The Justice (2011 Act) (Commencement No. 5) Order (Northern Ireland) 2012 (S.R. 2012 No. 449 (C. 47))
 The Health and Safety (Miscellaneous Revocations) Regulations (Northern Ireland) 2012 (S.R. 2012 No. 450)
 The Motor Vehicles (Driving Licences) (Amendment No. 3) Regulations (Northern Ireland) 2012 (S.R. 2012 No. 451)
 The Common Agricultural Policy Single Payment and Support Schemes (Cross Compliance) (Amendment) Regulations (Northern Ireland) 2012 (S.R. 2012 No. 452)
 The Pollution Prevention and Control (Industrial Emissions) Regulations (Northern Ireland) 2012 (S.R. 2012 No. 453)
 Gas (Meter Testing and Stamping) Regulations (Northern Ireland) 2012 (S.R. 2012 No. 454)
 Superannuation (Victims and Survivors Service Limited) Order (Northern Ireland) 2012 (S.R. 2012 No. 455)
 The Less Favoured Area Compensatory Allowances Regulations (Northern Ireland) 2012 (S.R. 2012 No. 456)
 The Common Agricultural Policy Support Schemes (Review of Decisions) (Amendment) Regulations (Northern Ireland) 2012 (S.R. 2012 No. 457)
 The Foyle Area and Carlingford Area (Angling) (Amendment) Regulations 2012 (S.R. 2012 No. 458)
 The Foyle Area (Control of Fishing) (Amendment) Regulations 2012 (S.R. 2012 No. 459)
 The Waiting Restrictions (Dungannon) (Amendment No. 2) Order (Northern Ireland) 2012 (S.R. 2012 No. 460)
 The Parking and Waiting Restrictions (Ballymena) (Amendment No. 2) Order (Northern Ireland) 2012 (S.R. 2012 No. 461)
 The Sex Discrimination Order 1976 (Amendment) Regulations (Northern Ireland) 2012 (S.R. 2012 No. 462)

References 

2012
2012 in Northern Ireland
Northern Ireland Statutory Rules